Handball Klub Svilengrad is a women's handball club from Svilengrad in Bulgaria. HC Svilengrad competes in the GHR A.

European record

Team

Current squad 

Squad for the 2016–17 season

Goalkeepers
  Gergana Aleksandrova
  Galya Balamova
  Totka Doykinova
  Rosina Hristova Nenova
  Desislava Todorova

Wingers
RW
  Rayna Georgieva
  Monika Radeva
LW 
  Miglena Hristova
Line Players 
  Ralitsa Dimitrova
  Roksana Radeva

Back players
LB
  Stefka Agova
CB 
  Deniza Asenova
  Desislava Ilieva 
RB
  Kristina Milanova
  Ganna Zakharova

External links
 Official website
 EHF Club profile

Bulgarian handball clubs